Peter Bruce Arnold (born 21 December 1935) is an Australian politician who represented the South Australian House of Assembly seat of Chaffey for the Liberal and Country League and Liberal Party from 1968 to 1970 and 1973 to 1993. He was appointed to the Parliamentary Standing Committee on Public Works and later on the Environment, Resources and Development Committee.

References

 

1935 births
Living people
Liberal Party of Australia members of the Parliament of South Australia
Members of the South Australian House of Assembly
Liberal and Country League politicians